Jerusalem is a Swedish Christian rock band, founded in 1975 by Ulf Christiansson. It was one of the first bands to combine Christian lyrics with a hard rock and heavy metal sound.

History

Jerusalem's message was primarily aimed at youth, with their lyrics describing the band's relationship to God in an ordinary, but radical way. The band's purpose was expressly evangelistic. Their concerts have been described as a series of revival meetings which often included altar calls and occasionally exorcisms.

Over time, Jerusalem gained broader acceptance, and after three years of touring record companies began making offers to record the band. The Christian record company Prim signed Jerusalem, without much expectation of success. However, the band's self-titled debut album, Jerusalem, became an instant hit among Christian listeners, and within the first six months the record sold 20,000 copies, unheard of within the genre of Christian rock in Europe.

From the Christian Greenbelt festival in England, where Jerusalem participated during the summer, Americans brought the record to the United States and Glen Kaiser, leader of Resurrection Band, one of the most prominent Christian rock bands in the US. Kaiser gave the record to Pat Boone, who owned Lamb & Lion Records. Lamb & Lion subsequently released Jerusalem's records in the United States and Canada.

With the fourth album, Vi Kan Inte Stoppas (Can't Stop Us Now), Jerusalem changed their style to a more melodic rock sound with lyrics that were not as overtly God-centered.

Eventually, however, this all became too much, and the members of the band tired out. In 1985, Jerusalem quit touring and enrolled in the Word of Life Bible School.

In 1987, Jerusalem released Dancing on the Head of the Serpent. Reidar I. Paulsen played the keyboards. The record sleeve depicted jeans and boots-clad person (the standard attire among skinheads) jumping on a person's head who appears to be half human/half lizard. This radical image proved too shocking for Swedish Christians. Some record stores banned the album, while others still stocked the album, but sold the record under the counter. After this album, the band took a six-year hiatus.

Members
Current
Jerusalem currently has two line-ups
 Ulf Christiansson - vocals, guitar (1975–present)
 Anders Mossberg - bass (1978? - 1981?, 1996–present)
 Dan Tibell - keyboards (1975–1985, 1996–present)
 Klas Anderhell - drums (1979? - 1981, 1996–present)
 Peter Carlsohn - bass (1981–1995, 2003? - present)
 Reidar I. Paulsen - keyboards (1986? - 1995?, 2006–present)*
 Michael Ulvsgärd - drums (1981–1995, 2003? - present)

Past
 Bertil Sörensson - bass (1978?)
 Danne Gansmoe - drums (1978?)
A lot of different musicians were at one time or another part of Jerusalem. These are just the ones who recorded with Jerusalem.

*Reidar Ingvald Paulsen changed name in 2007 for Reidar Ingvald Paasche

Discography
For albums released in both Swedish and English versions, the English titles are in parentheses.

Studio albums 

 Jerusalem (Volume 1) (1978/1980)
 Volym 2 (Volume 2) (1980/1981)
 Krigsman (Warrior) (1981/1982)
 Vi Kan Inte Stoppas (Can't Stop Us Now) (1983/1984)
 Dancing on the Head of the Serpent (1987/1988)
 Prophet (1994)
 Volym 3 (Those Were the Days) (1996/1997)
 Volüm Fyra (R.A.D.) (1997/1998)
 She (2010)

Live albums 

 In His Majesty's Service – Live in USA (1985)
 Live – På Ren Svenska (1998)

Compilation albums 

 10 Years After (1988)
 Klassiker 1 (Classics 1) (1993/1996)
 Klassiker 2 (Classics 2) (1993/1996)
 Classics 3 (1995)
 Tretti (2006)
 Greatest Hits (2006)

References

External links
 

Christian rock groups
Swedish Christian metal musical groups
Musical groups from Gothenburg